The Wyoming Valley is a historic industrialized region of Northeastern Pennsylvania. The region is historically notable for its influence in helping fuel the American Industrial Revolution with its many anthracite coal-mines. As a metropolitan area, it is known as the Scranton/Wilkes-Barre metropolitan area, after its principal cities, Scranton and  Wilkes-Barre. With a population of 567,559 as of the 2020 United States census, it is the  fifth-largest metropolitan area in Pennsylvania, after the Delaware Valley, Greater Pittsburgh, the Lehigh Valley, and the Harrisburg–Carlisle metropolitan statistical areas.

Within the geology of Pennsylvania the Wyoming Valley makes up its own unique physiographic province, the  Anthracite Valley. Greater Pittston occupies the center of the valley. Scranton is the most populated city in the metropolitan area with a population of 77,114. The city of Scranton grew in population after the 2015 mid-term census while Wilkes-Barre declined in population. Wilkes-Barre remains  the second most-populated city in the metropolitan area, while Hazleton is the third most-populated city in the metropolitan area.

The valley is a crescent-shaped depression, a part of the  ridge-and-valley or folded  Appalachians. The Susquehanna River occupies the southern part of the valley, which is notable for its deposits of anthracite. These have been extensively mined. Deep mining of anthracite has declined throughout the greater Coal Region, however, due to the greater economics of strip mining. Parts of the local mines had already shut down because some coal beds were on fire and had to be sealed; but the exodus of mining companies came quickly following the legal and political repercussions of the 1959 Knox Mine Disaster—when the roof of the Knox Coal Company's mine under the Susquehanna River collapsed. The Pocono Mountains, a ridgeline away, are often visible from higher elevations to the east and to the southeast of the Wyoming Valley.

History

Early history

The name Wyoming derives from the Lenape Munsee name , meaning "at the big river flat."

According to the Jesuit Relation of 1635, the Wyoming Valley was inhabited by the Scahentoarrhonon people, an Iroquoian-speaking group; it was then known as the Scahentowanen Valley. By 1744, it was inhabited by Lenape, Mahican, Shawnee and others who had been pushed out of eastern areas by the Iroquois Confederacy.  From the 1740s to the 1760s, the valley was the site of Moravian mission work among the Native Americans living there. They envisioned a settlement for Christian Indians.  But the violence of the French and Indian War, known outside the US as part of the Seven Years' War, drove these settlers away with David Zeisberger, the Moravian "Apostle to the Indians."

Pennsylvania's and Connecticut's conflicting claims to the territory—King Charles II of England had granted the land to the colony of Connecticut in 1662, and also to William Penn in 1681—led to military skirmishes known as the Pennamite Wars. After Yankee settlers from Connecticut founded the town of Wilkes-Barre in 1769, armed bands of Pennsylvanians (Pennamites) tried without success to expel them in 1769–70, and again in 1775.

Revolutionary War

During the American Revolutionary War, the Battle of Wyoming took place in the valley on July 3, 1778, in which more than 300 Revolutionaries died at the hands of Loyalists and their Iroquois allies.  The incident was depicted by the Scottish poet Thomas Campbell in his 1809 poem Gertrude of Wyoming. At the time, rebel colonists widely believed that Joseph Brant, a Mohawk chief, had led the Iroquois forces; in the poem, Brant is described as the "Monster Brant" because of the atrocities committed. Later colonists determined that Brant had not been present at this conflict.  The popularity of the poem may have led to the state of Wyoming later being named after the valley.

Founding of Luzerne County
The Yankee-Pennamite Wars were eventually settled in the 1780s. The disputed land was granted to Pennsylvania. The Wyoming Valley became part of  Northumberland County. However, Connecticut settlers wanted to create a new state in Northeastern Pennsylvania. Massachusetts businessman Timothy Pickering was sent to the region to politically examine the situation. This led to the Pennsylvania Assembly passing a resolution which created Luzerne County. This ended the idea of creating a new state. On September 25, 1786, Luzerne County was formed from part of Northumberland County. It was named after Chevalier de la Luzerne, a French soldier and diplomat during the 18th century. When it was founded, Luzerne County occupied a large portion of Northeastern Pennsylvania. From 1810 to 1878, it was divided into several smaller counties. The counties of Bradford, Lackawanna, Susquehanna, and Wyoming were all formed from parts of Luzerne County.

Metropolitan Statistical Area
The Scranton–Wilkes-Barre–Hazleton, PA Metropolitan Statistical Area, also known as the Wyoming Valley, covers Lackawanna, Luzerne, and Wyoming counties.  It had a combined population of 558,166 in 2015. The counties adjacent to Wyoming Valley include Monroe County (Southeast), Susquehanna County (Northeast), Wayne County (East), Columbia County (West), Bradford County (Northwest), Carbon County (South), Sullivan County (West) and Schuylkill County (Southwest). As of 2000, the area also had the highest percentage of non-Hispanic whites of any U.S. metropolitan area with a population over 500,000, with 96.2% of the population stating their race as white alone and not claiming Hispanic ethnicity, however the Hispanic demographic has been significantly rising since then.

When metropolitan areas were first defined in 1950, Scranton and Wilkes-Barre were in separate metropolitan areas. Lackawanna County was defined as the Scranton Standard Metropolitan Area, while Luzerne County was defined as the Wilkes-Barre–Hazleton metropolitan area. The two metropolitan areas were merged after the 1970 census as the Northeast Pennsylvania Standard metropolitan statistical area, with Monroe County added as a component. It was renamed the Scranton/Wilkes-Barre metropolitan statistical area after the 1980 census, and Columbia and Wyoming counties were added. Hazleton was added as a primary city in the 1990 census, while Monroe County lost its metropolitan status.  After the 2000 census, Columbia County lost metropolitan status, while Hazleton was removed as a primary city. Scranton is the largest city in Lackawanna County as well as the entire metropolitan area by a large margin, nearly doubling the population of the second largest city in the metropolitan area, Wilkes Barre.

Physical valley

The physical Wyoming Valley, also referred to as the Anthracite Valley Section, is different from the Wyoming Valley metropolitan statistical area. It includes the cities of Carbondale, Scranton, Pittston, Wilkes-Barre, and Nanticoke. Even though Wyoming County is part of the Wyoming Valley Metropolitan Statistical Area, it is not part of the physical valley.

Culture
Scranton is the cultural center of the Wyoming Valley, being the largest city by population in the metropolitan area.

Sports
The Wyoming Valley also has professional sports teams; they include the Scranton/Wilkes-Barre RailRiders (Minor League Baseball Class AAA), the Wilkes-Barre/Scranton Penguins (American Hockey League), and the Scranton/Wilkes-Barre Steamers (Premier Basketball League). The Wilkes-Barre/Scranton Pioneers were a minor league arena football team in Wilkes-Barre (from 2001 to 2009).

Local attractions
Local attractions include the Mohegan Sun Arena at Casey Plaza in Wilkes-Barre, the Pocono Raceway in Long Pond, PNC Field in Moosic, Mohegan Pennsylvania in Plains, the Toyota Pavilion in Scranton, the Wyoming Valley Mall in Wilkes-Barre, the Shoppes at Montage in Moosic, the Steamtown Mall in Scranton, the Viewmont Mall in Scranton/Dickson City, Pennsylvania, and the Montage Mountain Waterpark/Ski Resort in Scranton. Other historic attractions include Eckley Miners' Village and the Steamtown National Historic Site.

Transportation
The airports for this area are Wilkes-Barre/Scranton International Airport and the Wilkes-Barre Wyoming Valley Airport.

See also
 Northeast Pennsylvania English
 Pennamite-Yankee War
 Battle of Wyoming

Notes

Citations

References
The following printed resources are in the collection of the Connecticut State Library (CSL):
 Boyd, J. P. The Susquehanna Company, 1753-1803. [CSL call number: F157 .W9 B69 1931]
 Henry, William (ed.). Documents Relating to the Connecticut Settlement in the Wyoming Valley. Bowie, MD: Heritage Books, Inc., 1990 [CSL call number: F157 .W9 D63 1990 v1, 2].
 Joyce, Mary Hinchcliffe. Pioneer Days in the Wyoming Valley. Philadelphia: 1928 [CSL call number: F157 .W9 J89].
 Smith, William. An Examination of the Connecticut Claim to Lands in Pennsylvania: With an Appendix, Containing Extracts and Copies Taken from Original Papers. Philadelphia: Joseph Crukshank, 1774 [CSL call number: Wells Collection F157 .W9 S55].
 Stark, S. Judson. The Wyoming Valley: Probate Records ... Wilkes-Barre, PA: Wyoming Historical and Geological Society, 1923 [CSL call number: F157 .W9 S72].
 Warfle, Richard Thomas. Connecticut's Western Colony; the Susquehannah Affair. (Connecticut Bicentennial Series, #32). Hartford, CT: American Revolutionary Bicentennial Commission of Connecticut, 1979 [CSL call number: Conn Doc Am35 cb num 32].
 Wilkes-Barre, Pennsylvania. Wilkes-Barre (the "Diamond City"), Luzerne County, Pennsylvania. Wilkes-Barre, PA: The Committee on Souvenir and Program, 1906 [CSL call number: F159 .W6 W65 1906].

External links

 Connecticut's "Susquehanna Settlers"
 History of the Wilkes-Barre area
 Sullivanclinton.com - the full historical context
 Sullivanclinton.com - Wyoming Valley today

 
Anthracite Coal Region of Pennsylvania
Pennsylvania in the American Revolution
Pre-statehood history of Pennsylvania
Pre-statehood history of Connecticut
Regions of Pennsylvania